This list shows all the members of Canada's Sports Hall of Fame. As of 2022, there are 668 members of the Hall of Fame.

Inductees

References

External links
 

 
Lists of celebrities
Lists of hall of fame inductees